Jean-Yves Blondeau (born June 1, 1970), also known as Rollerman, is a French designer who is best known for inventing the 32-wheel roller suit.

Biography
Blondeau was born in Aix-les-Bains, Savoy, France to Paul Blondeau and Micheline Blondeau. He has four brothers and a sister.

Buggy rollin
Blondeau is the inventor of the 32-wheel roller suit (also known as the wheel suit or buggy rollin). This suit places a number of rollers (similar to those found on rollerblades) on most of the major joints, the torso, and the back. The wearer can ride downhill in a variety of positions (upright, prone, supine, on all fours, etc.) at speeds of up to 78 mph (126 km/h). He has been featured on television shows in several countries on all continents. The buggy rollin wheel suit can be used on any surface suitable for roller skates.

He built the roller suit as part of his graduation project at the industrial design school École nationale supérieure des arts appliqués et des métiers d'art (also known as the Olivier de Serres) in Paris. The study theme was: "systems that underline the sensations caused by the displacement of the human center of gravity  in relation to support points in order to move into space". The research phase lasted for 6 months, followed by 1 month of synthesis and 2 months for producing the prototype. Then followed a year of secret patent application writing, finally published in June 1995.

Since then, six generations of buggy-rollins have been created. They include variations from the most basic kneepad with rollers to the most sophisticated one called "Super Rollin Bionic Woman" (SURBO). The prototypes have evolved into safer, more comfortable and easier machines that can be adapted to all different morphologies.

Two of his suits can be seen in a short scene partway through the end credits of the 2008 Jim Carrey film Yes Man. Two other suits were featured in a commercial for Mennen filmed in South Africa and intended for distribution in South America in 2010. He also featured in a commercial for Megapass, a broadband telecommunication service in South Korea. In 2011 he took part in Stan Lee's Superhumans TV program. Blondeau trained Jackie Chan to use a roller suit in the 2012 film Chinese Zodiac.

See also
 Inline speed skating
 Road skating

References

External links
 Buggy Rollin Official Website
 Jean-Yves Blondeau at YouTube

1970 births
Living people
French designers
Ripley's Believe It or Not!